Route 230A, also known as Old Bonavista Highway, is a  alternate route of Route 230 at the southwestern corner of the Bonavista Peninsula on the island of Newfoundland. It represents the former route of Route 230 through Clarenville, Milton, and George's Brook.

Route description

Route 230A begins at an intersection with the Trans-Canada Highway (Route 1) in Clarenville and heads east through a major business district along Manitoba Drive. It then merges onto Memorial Drive and passes through downtown and some neighbourhoods before becoming Balbo Drive as it crosses over the Shoal Harbour Causeway Bridge to pass through Shoal Harbour. The highway then leaves the Clarenville town limits and winds its way along the coast to pass through Milton, where it has an intersection with Route 231 (Random Island Road), and George's Brook, where it has an intersection with Route 232 (Smith Sound Road). Route 230A now leaves the coast and passes northeast through rural areas before coming to an end at an intersection with Route 230 (Bonavista Peninsula Highway) directly beside of Clarenville Airport.

Major intersections

References

230A